Rafael Nadal defeated Daniil Medvedev in the final, 7–5, 6–3, 5–7, 4–6, 6–4 to win the men's singles tennis title at the 2019 US Open. It was his fourth US Open title and 19th major title overall. Nadal's victory meant that every major title since the beginning of 2017 had been won by either himself (5), Novak Djokovic (4) or Roger Federer (3). This was the first time since 2006–08 that Djokovic, Federer, and Nadal had claimed all four major singles titles in three consecutive years.

Djokovic was the defending champion, but retired due to a left shoulder injury against Stan Wawrinka in the fourth round. This was the first time since 2006 that Djokovic failed to reach the semifinals (not counting the 2017 tournament, which he also missed due to injury).

Federer was attempting to win an Open Era record sixth US Open title, but lost in the quarterfinals to Grigor Dimitrov.  This was the final US Open appearance of Federer's career.

The respective losses of Wawrinka and Federer in the quarterfinals guaranteed a first-time finalist in the top half of the draw. Medvedev became the second Russian player (after Marat Safin) to reach the final. Medvedev also became the first Russian man to reach a major final since Safin at the 2005 Australian Open.

Dimitrov (ranked 78th) became the lowest-ranked men's singles semifinalist at the US Open since Jimmy Connors (ranked 174th) in 1991. Dimitrov was also the lowest-ranked men's singles semifinalist at any major since Rainer Schüttler (ranked 92nd) at the 2008 Wimbledon Championships.

This was the first time in the Open Era that four quarterfinalists (Federer, Nadal, Wawrinka and Gaël Monfils) were 33 years old or older.

It was also the last major appearance for 2010 Wimbledon finalist and former world No. 4 Tomáš Berdych.

Seeds
All seedings per ATP rankings.

Qualifying

Draw

Finals

Top half

Section 1

Section 2

Section 3

Section 4

Bottom half

Section 5

Section 6

Section 7

Section 8

Championship match ratings
2.751 million viewers on ESPN, in the United States.

References

External links
Main draw
2019 US Open – Men's draws and results at the International Tennis Federation

Men's Singles
US Open – Men's Singles
US Open (tennis) by year – Men's singles